Nonie may refer to:

 2382 Nonie, a main-belt asteroid
 Nonie Buencamino (born 1966), a Filipino actor
 Nonie Darwish (born 1949), an Egyptian-American human rights activist
 Nonie Lynch (born Nonie Crawford; 1910–2011), an Irish traditional singer
 Nonie May Stewart Worthington Leeds (1878-1923), a wealthy American heiress
 Ruth Winona Tao (a.k.a. Nonie Tao, born 1963), an American-born Chinese film actress